The Kapichira Power Station is a hydroelectric power plant at the Kapachira Falls on the Shire River in  Malawi. The power station was developed in stages, with the first phase involving the installation of the first two 32 megawatts-generating turbines. Phase I of the power station was officially opened in September 2000.

In January 2014, in a ceremony attended by the president of Malawi at that time, Joyce Banda, the second phase of the Kapichira hydropower project was switched on, doubling the hitherto 64 megawatts to the maximum capacity of 128 megawatts.

Location
The geographical coordinates of this power station are: 15°53'45.0"S, 34°45'14.0"E (Latitude:-15.895833; Longitude:34.753889).

Overview
The power station was built in two phases, with the first phase completed in 2000.

Construction
The first phase of the power station was built with funds borrowed from several international development partners, including (a) KfW (b) the European Investment Bank (c) the Commonwealth Development Corporation and (d) the World Bank (e) the Netherlands Development Finance Company. The development partners jointly loaned US$131.1 million and the government of Malawi invested US$21.9 million, for a total of US$153 million. The second phase was contracted to China Gezhouba Group Corporation (CGGC) and included the installation of two new turbines, each of capacity generation of 32 megawatts. Work was completed in January 2014.

Storm damage and repairs
On 24 January 2022, Tropical Storm Ana struck the dam and power station, causing catastrophic damage, leading to closure of the installation. This led to the loss of an estimated 130 MW of generation capacity, equivalent to about 30 percent of national output.

In June 2022, Lazarus Chakwera, the president of Malawi, announced that the World Bank had lent Malawi MWK:60 billion (US$60 million) to repair and rehabilitate Kapichira Hydroelectric Power Station. Following these repairs, it is expected that the new generation capacity will be 135 megawatts.

See also

 List of power stations in Malawi
 List of power stations in Africa

References

External links
Energy supply in Malawi: Options and issues As of May 2015.
Malawi: Kapichira Hydro Power Station to Be Restored By December As of 28 July 2022.

Energy infrastructure completed in 2014
Hydroelectric power stations in Malawi
2014 establishments in Malawi
Southern Region, Malawi